Graduated from the Military College in March 1955 and commissioned in an armoured regiment. Was a principal staff officer (GSO-II) in an Armoured brigade in Yemen. Completed Air Defense officer's course in 1969. Commanded an SA-2 and SA-3 Battalion between 1969 and 1973, and a SAM Brigade between 1973 and 1977.
Commander of the Air Defence Forces from Oct.1987 to Dec.1990.

Major Activities:

Commanding a Brigade of Air Defence units during 6 October war.
Augmenting Chaparral missile system to the Air defence forces.
Continuing the studies of applying the automation system to Air Defence forces.
Participated in the following wars :

 Tripartite Aggression
 North Yemen Civil War
 Six Day War
 Yom Kippur War

References

Egyptian generals
1934 births
Living people